The 2015 Winter Universiade, the XXVII Winter Universiade, was a multi sport winter event held in Granada, Spain and Štrbské Pleso, Slovakia. On 14 March 2009, FISU announced that the host would be Granada because they were the only bid.

On 25 June 2014, FISU announced that Slovakia would become the co-host of 2015 Winter Universiade. FISU approved to move the Nordic Skiing and Biathlon events to Štrbské Pleso and Osrblie in Slovakia. This decision had been taken to anticipate the difficulties faced by the Granada 2015 Organising Committee in hosting these particular events.

Sports
Four sports took place in Slovakia, from January 24 – February 1. From February 4 – 14, the other sports were contested in Granada.

Granada

Slovakia

Schedule
The competition schedule for the 2015 Winter Universiade is shown as follows:

Štrbské Pleso/Osrblie

Granada

Venues

Granada
 Palacio de Exposiciones y Congresos de Granada — opening ceremony
 Palacio Municipal de Deportes de Granada — men's ice hockey and closing ceremony
 Pabellón de Mulhacén — women's ice hockey
 Pabellón de Universiada — curling
 Sierra Nevada Ski Station - alpine skiing
 Universiade Igloo - figure skating and short track speed skating

Štrbské Pleso/Osrblie, Slovakia
 Štrbské Pleso - cross country skiing, Nordic combined and ski jumping, opening and closing ceremonies
 Osrblie - biathlon

Participants
Following is a list of nations that entered athletes at the Universiade:

 
 
 
 
 
 
 
 
 
 
 
 
 
 
 
 
 
 
 
 
 
 
 
 
  
 
 
 
 
 
 
 
  (co-host)
 
 
 
  (co-host)

Combinated Medal table

References

External links
FISU
Universiada de Invierno. Granada 2015
2015 Winter Universiade (Nordic Skiing & Biathlon) Štrbské Pleso/Osrblie, Slovakia
Results book

 
2015
Universiade
Universiade
Winter Universiade
Winter
Winter
Sport in Granada
Sport in Banská Bystrica Region
Sport in Prešov Region
Multi-sport events in Spain
Multi-sport events in Slovakia
January 2015 sports events in Europe
February 2015 sports events in Europe
Winter sports competitions in Slovakia
January 2015 sports events in Spain
February 2015 sports events in Spain